Peng Cheng (April 23, 1997) is a Chinese pair skater. With current partner Jin Yang, she is a two-time Four Continents medalist (silver in 2020, bronze in 2019), two-time Grand Prix Final silver medalist (2018–19, 2019–20), and the 2017 Asian Winter Games silver medalist. Peng/Jin represented China at the 2018 Winter Olympics and the 2022 Winter Olympics.

With former partner Zhang Hao, she is the 2015 Four Continents silver medalist and competed at the 2014 Winter Olympics.

Career 
Early in her career, Peng competed with Zhang Tianci.

Partnership with Zhang Hao

2012–13 season
Her partnership with Zhang Hao was announced in May 2012. The pair made their international debut at the 2012 Cup of China. They placed eleventh at their first World Championships.

2013–14 season
In the 2013–14 season, Peng/Zhang won their first Grand Prix medals, bronze at the 2013 Cup of China and silver at the 2013 NHK Trophy, and qualified for the Grand Prix Final, where they came in fourth. They were selected for the 2014 Winter Olympics and finished eighth in Sochi. Ending their season, they placed fifth at the 2014 World Championships in Saitama.

2014–15 season
For the 2014–15 Grand Prix season, Peng/Zhang were assigned to Skate America and Cup of China, where they placed third and first, respectively, qualifying for the 2015 Grand Prix Final. They finished fourth at that competition after placing fifth in the short program and third in the free skate.

They won the silver medal at the 2015 Four Continents Figure Skating Championships. At the 2015 World Figure Skating Championships, they earned personal best scores in the free skate and combined total to finish in fourth place overall.

2015–16 season
Peng/Zhang's final season together began at the 2015 Trophée Éric Bompard, where they placed fourth in the short program, before the remainder of the event was cancelled as a result of the terrorist attacks in Paris.  They won the bronze medal at the 2015 Rostelecom Cup, qualifying for the Grand Prix Final, which had been expanded as a result of the Paris incident.  They finished sixth there.

In their final event together, the 2016 World Championships, they performed poorly, placing twelfth in the short program and ninth in the free skate, for twelfth place overall.

Partnership with Jin Yang

2016–17 season
On April 14, 2016, International Figure Skating magazine broke the news of Peng's new partnership with Jin Yang. The Chinese Skating Association decided to switch partners between the two pairs of Peng/Zhang and Yu/Jin.

Peng/Jin debuted on the Grand Prix with two silver medals at the 2016 Cup of China and the 2016 NHK Trophy, earning a place in the Grand Prix Final, where they finished sixth.  They won their first national title at the 2017 Chinese Championships.

Competing at the 2017 Four Continents Championships, their first ISU Championship event, they placed fifth.  At the 2017 Asian Winter Games, Peng/Jin won the silver medal behind Yu/Zhang.  This concluded their season.

2017–18 season
The two won the 2017 CS Finlandia Trophy, their first international gold medal together.  The Grand Prix was a disappointment, with Peng/Jin finishing fifth at both the 2017 Skate America and 2017 Internationaux de France.  At the 2018 Chinese Championships, they finished second behind Yu/Zhang and were named to China's team for the 2018 Winter Olympics.

Peng/Jin competed in the pairs event in Pyeongchang, finishing seventeenth in the short program and thus missing the free skate by a single ordinal.  Their season concluded at the 2018 World Championships, where they finished ninth.

2018–19 season
With both Sui Wenjing / Han Cong and Yu/Zhang sidelined by injury at the beginning of the season, Peng/Jin were the sole Chinese pair team competing internationally on the senior level.  They began with a gold medal at the 2018 CS Asian Open.

On the Grand Prix, Peng/Jin began at the 2018 Skate Canada International, where they won the silver medal, finishing ahead of bronze medalists Kirsten Moore-Towers / Michael Marinaro by 0.15 points.  The two struggled on their side-by-side jumps in the free skate, where they finished fourth, an area where Jin said they hoped to improve.  At the 2018 NHK Trophy, they won a second silver medal by a far more decisive margin.  They qualified to the Grand Prix Final, with Peng noting that "we feel like we miss our teammates, but advancing to the Grand Prix Final is something we are proud of."  At the Final, they placed first in the short program and second in the free skate, winning silver overall.  This was the team's first major international medal.

They won their second national title at the 2019 Chinese Championships.  At the 2019 Four Continents Championships in Anaheim, they placed third in the short program behind Moore-Towers/Marinaro and a returning Sui/Han, in consequence of Peng falling on their throw jump.  They also came third in the free skate, making an error on the side-by-side triple Salchow jumps, finishing third overall, their first ISU Championship medal.  Peng commented, "despite the success rate of the triple jump in the training, we want to try that and challenge ourselves and show what we have done in our training."

Concluding the season at the 2019 World Championships, Peng/Jin placed third in the short program, earning a small bronze medal.  They came fifth in the free skate due to Peng underrotating her triple Salchow attempt and finished fourth overall, off the podium, by 1.97 points.  Jin reflected on the season: " We are satisfied with overall performances. We could pull out what we can. Of course, for some details, there are some areas to improve. The biggest accomplishment this season is to get our names out so that judges recognize us. For next season, we continue to improve our performance."

2019–20 season
Peng/Jin debuted at the 2019 CS U.S. Classic, taking the bronze medal.  They then won the 2019 Shanghai Trophy.

On the Grand Prix series, Peng/Jin first competed at 2019 Skate America, placing first in the short program despite Peng stepping out on and underrotating her side-by-side jump.  They also placed first in the free skate, despite a fall on a throw triple loop, taking their first Grand Prix gold medal together.  They did not skate in the gala due to the throw jump fall impacting Peng's ankle.  At their second event, the 2019 Cup of China, Peng/Jin placed narrowly third in the short program after Peng fell on a jump and they had unison issues with their spins.  They rose to second place and the silver medal in the free skate.

Qualifying to the Grand Prix Final, Peng/Jin lost their skates on the way there and consequently could not practice for five days, though they were ultimately returned the day before the competition began.  They were fifth in the short program following Peng putting her foot down on their throw triple loop.  Jin said that Peng's ankle injury from Skate America was "quite stubborn and not becoming better", impacting their training.  They skated cleanly in the free skate, narrowly placing first in that segment, and rose to second place overall, winning their second consecutive Final silver medal.

Peng/Jin skated cleanly to place second in the short program at the 2020 Four Continents Championships in Seoul.  Jin said they were quite satisfied with their performance, while Peng revealed that sickness and a leg injury had impacted their training after the Grand Prix Final.  Second in the free skate as well with only a step out on a throw triple loop, they won the silver medal behind Sui/Han.  They were assigned to compete at the World Championships in Montreal, but these were cancelled as a result of the coronavirus pandemic.

2020–21 season
With the pandemic continuing to affect international travel, the ISU assigned the Grand Prix based largely on geography, with Peng/Jin being assigned to the 2020 Cup of China.  Following withdrawals from some other Chinese teams, including Sui/Han, Peng/Jin won the gold medal by almost 50 points out of the three teams attending.

In March at the 2021 World Championships in Stockholm, Peng fell at the beginning of the short program, breaking one of the zippers on her dress, but continued the performance and put her hand down on her underrotated jump attempt. They placed fifth in that segment. Peng also made errors on both jumps in the free skate, and they placed sixth in that segment but remained in fifth place overall.

2021–22 season
Peng/Jin's first Grand Prix assignment was initially the 2021 Cup of China, but following its cancellation, they were reassigned to the 2021 Gran Premio d'Italia. Making their season debut, they placed second in both segments to take the silver medal behind Sui/Han. The Chinese federation opted to withdraw them from their second event, the 2021 Internationaux de France, as a result of which they could not qualify for the Grand Prix Final.

Assigned to the Chinese Olympic team, Peng/Jin began the 2022 Winter Olympics as their country's entry in the pairs free skate segment of the Olympic team event. They were third in the segment despite Peng's multiple jump errors and their final lift exiting early, while the Chinese team finished in fifth place. In the pairs event, Peng/Jin were fifth in the short program. In the free skate, Peng underrotated and stepped out of her triple Salchow attempt, but they placed sixth in the segment and remained fifth overall. Jin said they had been under "great pressure because we had the disappointing score" at the previous Olympics and failed to qualify for the free skate but that they were pleased to have performed well in Beijing.

2022–23 season
Peng and Jin were slated to compete at the 2022 Grand Prix of Espoo and 2022 Grand Prix de France, but withdrew from both events.

Programs

With Jin

With Zhang

Competitive highlights 
GP: Grand Prix; CS: Challenger Series

With Jin

With Zhang

Detailed results

With Jin

With Zhang

References

External links 

 
 

1997 births
Living people
Figure skaters from Harbin
Chinese female pair skaters
Four Continents Figure Skating Championships medalists
Figure skaters at the 2014 Winter Olympics
Figure skaters at the 2018 Winter Olympics
Figure skaters at the 2022 Winter Olympics
Olympic figure skaters of China
Figure skaters at the 2017 Asian Winter Games
Medalists at the 2017 Asian Winter Games
Asian Games silver medalists for China
Asian Games medalists in figure skating